Neocancilla madagascariensis is a species of sea snail, a marine gastropod mollusk, in the family Mitridae, the miters or miter snails.

Distribution
This species occurs in the following locations:
 Madagascar
 Maldives
 Mauritius
 Mozambique
 Sri Lanka

References

madagascariensis
Gastropods described in 2017